The Northeast Conference Men's Soccer Coach of the Year is a soccer award given to head coaches in the Northeast Conference (NEC). The award is granted to the head coach voted to be the most successful that season by the league's coaches. The award was first given following the 1986 season, the sixth year of the conference's existence, to Bill Sento of Loyola (MD). St. Francis Brooklyn and Monmouth, which is no longer a member of the NEC, are the programs that have been awarded the most, each with five.

Winners

Winners by school

References

NCAA Division I men's soccer conference coaches of the year
Coach